Wahb ibn ʿUmayr was a companion of the Islamic prophet Muhammad and the son of Umayr ibn Wahb. He witnessed the conquest of Egypt. Wahb ibn Umayr was the leader of the Battle of Amuriyah in the Egyptian sea in 23 AH. He died as a Mujahid while in Sham.

See also
Umayr ibn Wahb, father
Family tree of Wahb ibn Umayr

References

External links
 https://web.archive.org/web/20050403165802/http://www.a2youth.com/islam/articles/sahabah/sahabah54.html

Companions of the Prophet